The 2016–17 Svenska Cupen was the 61st season of Svenska Cupen and the fifth season with the current format. The winners of the competition will earn a place in the second qualifying round of the 2017–18 UEFA Europa League, unless they have already qualified for European competition in the 2017–18 season, in which case the qualification spot will go to fourth-placed team of the 2016 Allsvenskan.

A total of 96 clubs will enter the competition.

The first two rounds were scheduled to be played before 3 August and 24 August 2016 respectively. The first round draw was announced on 21 April 2016, and the draw for the second round was announced on 7 July 2016.

The group stage will be played on the last two weekends in February 2017, and the last group stage round will be played on 5 and 6 March 2017. The following quarter-finals and semi-finals are scheduled to be played on the weekend of 12 March and 19 March 2017 respectively, before the tournament ends with the final on 13 or 14 April 2017.

Round and draw dates
The schedule of the competition is as follows.

Qualifying rounds 

The associations of the Swedish District Football Associations could choose to have qualifying rounds or having teams being determined through district championships or by club ranking in 2015.

Round 1
64 teams from the third tier or lower of the Swedish league system will compete in this round. The matches will be played on 3 August 2016 at the latest.

Round 2
All teams from 2016 Allsvenskan and 2016 Superettan enter in this round, 32 teams in total, where they will be joined by the 32 winners from round 1. The 32 teams from Allsvenskan and Superettan were seeded and will play against the 32 winners from round 1, the matches will be played at the home venues for the unseeded teams. The 16 northernmost seeded teams were drawn against the 16 northernmost unseeded teams and the same with the southernmost teams.

The draw for the second round was held on 7 July 2016, and the matches will be played on 24 and 25 August 2016, but some matches may be moved to a later date depending on participation in 2016–17 UEFA Champions League and 2016–17 UEFA Europa League. The number in brackets indicates what tier of Swedish football each team competed in during the 2016 season.

Group stage
The 32 winners from round 2 will be divided into eight groups of four teams. The 16 highest ranked winners from the previous rounds will be seeded to the top two positions in each groups and the 16 remaining winners will be unseeded in the draw. The ranking of the 16 seeded teams will be decided by league position in the 2016 season. All teams in the group stage play each other once, the highest ranked teams from the previous rounds and teams from tier three or lower have the right to play two home matches.

The group stage will begin on 18 February and conclude on 5 March 2017.

All times listed below are in Central European Time (UTC+1).

Tie-breaking criteria
If two or more teams are equal on points on completion of the group matches, the following criteria will be applied to determine the rankings
Superior goal difference
Higher number of goals scored
Result between the teams in question
Higher league position in the 2016 season

Qualified teams

Seeded
AIK (1)
BK Häcken (1)
Dalkurd FF (2)
Djurgårdens IF (1)
Falkenbergs FF (1)
Gefle IF (1)
Halmstads BK (2)
Hammarby IF (1)
Helsingborgs IF (1)
IF Elfsborg (1)
IFK Göteborg (1)
IFK Norrköping (1)
IK Sirius (2)
Kalmar FF (1)
Örebro SK (1)
Östersunds FK (1)

Unseeded
Arameiska-Syrianska IF (4)
BKV Norrtälje (4)
GAIS (2)
Degerfors IF (2)
IF Brommapojkarna (3)
IFK Värnamo (2)
Kristianstad FC (3)
Landskrona BoIS (3)
Nyköpings BIS (3)
Trelleborgs FF (2)
Varbergs BoIS (2)
Vänersborgs FK (4)
Ytterhogdals IK (5)
Åtvidabergs FF (2)
Ängelholms FF (2) (withdrew and were replaced by Ljungskile SK.)
Örgryte IS (2)

Group 1

Group 2

Group 3

Group 4

Group 5

Group 6

Group 7

Group 8

Knockout stage

Qualified teams

Bracket

Quarter-finals
The quarter-finals consists of the eight teams that won their respective group in the previous round. The four best group winners were seeded and drawn against the other four group winners, with the seeded teams entitled to play the match at their home venue. IF Brommapojkarna and Trelleborgs FF are the lowest ranked teams in the quarter-finals as they will play in the second tier, Superettan, for the 2017 season, while the other teams will play in the top tier, Allsvenskan.

The draw for the quarter-finals and semi-finals was held on 5 March 2017. and the quarter-final matches will be played on 11 and 12 March 2017.

Semi-finals
The semi-finals consist of the four winners from the quarter-finals. The draw was a free draw and the first drawn team in each pairing will play the match at their home venue.

The matches will be played on 18 and 19 March 2017.

Final

Notes

References

External links
 Official site 

Svenska Cupen seasons
Cupen
Cupen
Sweden